Granisle is a village on Babine Lake in the Northern Interior of British Columbia, Canada, to the north of Topley between Burns Lake and Houston.

History 

The early inhabitants of the area were Carrier Indians, called "Babine" by the early explorers, referring to the distended ornamented lower lips of the native women.

The village of Granisle was founded in the late 1960s and early 1970s on the shores of Babine Lake as a home for the families of the miners working in the nearby copper mines. Granisle was incorporated as a village in 1971. At the height of its population, Granisle boasted approximately 3,000 people.

After the last mine shut down in 1992, the community transformed into a retirement destination. Tourism in the area also began to grow and is now the area's main industry.

In 1971 workmen excavating in an open-pit copper mine at Babine Lake discovered the partly articulated skeleton of a Columbian Mammoth. The bones were taken from silty pond deposits overlain by very thick boulder-clay deposited by the last glacier that covered the area. Radiocarbon dates indicate that the animal sank in sticky pond deposits about 34,000 years ago. A replica of some of the Mammoth's Bones can be seen at the Granisle Museum.

Demographics 

Village

Granisle had an ice hockey team in the now non-existent Pacific Northwest Hockey League.

References

External links

Villages in British Columbia
Populated places in the Regional District of Bulkley-Nechako
Mining communities in British Columbia